1992 Vyshcha Liha was the first football championship organized in Ukraine after the dissolution of the Soviet Union and officially recognized by the UEFA. The last Soviet season finished in fall of 1991.

The Football Federation of Ukraine when organizing the competition decided to shift its calendar to synchronize it with one common in Europe "fall-spring" and organized a short championship.

The first two games of the Round 1 took place on 6 March 1992 in Odesa where local Chornomorets was hosting Karpaty, and Mykolaiv where local Evis was playing against the visiting Temp.

Teams and organization

League's formation and issues

Composition 
The league and its calendar were adopted at the FFU Executive Committee session on 10 September 1991 with the ongoing 1991 season of the All-Soviet football competitions. It was established that the new league will consist of 20 teams divided in two groups. Six clubs (last three from each group) were set to be relegated and replaced with two best from the First League, thus reducing the league for the next season to 16. Winners of both groups were to play against one another for the national title. The league's final was originally planned to consist of two games (home and away), but later due to scheduling of the Ukraine national football team's games it was changed to one on a neutral field.

To the league were included all Ukrainian clubs of the 1991 Soviet Top and First leagues (8 clubs), nine of eleven Ukrainian clubs out the 1991 Soviet Second League (all of them competed in the west zone), the two best teams of the 1991 Soviet Second (lower) League and the winner of the Ukrainian Cup. The FFU president Viktor Bannikov was against to include the Ukrainian Cup winner into the top league.

There were opponents of organization of the championship among the most notable was FC Metalurh Zaporizhya. The FC Metalist Kharkiv was against with the condition if they would be relegated from the 1991 Soviet Top League. Also against the championship was Yevhen Kucherevskyi (FC Dnipro Dnipropetrovsk, one of few Ukrainian coaches who managed to win the Soviet Top League).

There were plenty of alternative proposition on the composition and the season's calendar among which from the president of Prykarpattia Anatoliy Revutskyi and the head coach of Temp Ishtvan Sekech.

Calendar 
The championship started on March 6, about a month later after the qualification rounds of another national tournament, the first edition of Ukrainian Cup. The first half of the season was scheduled to finish on April 19 with the second one to resume on April 25 (6 days intermission). The last round was to be played on June 17.

Considering such a schedule and the fact that the Ukrainian Cup competition was on the way simultaneously, the Ukrainian clubs had to forfeit their scheduled games in the Soviet Cup competition. In addition to that Dynamo Kyiv also participated in the Champions League competition which ended for Dynamo only on April 15. Each team this season had at least two games scheduled every week on average.

Considering other official games (outside of the league), FC Torpedo Zaporizhzhia and FC Dynamo Kyiv has played the record of 26 games from February 18 through June 21 and the most among the other clubs in the League.

Location of teams

Qualified teams 

Note:
FC Temp Shepetivka placed only 9th in the 1991 Soviet Lower Second League.
FC Halychyna Drohobych and FC Vorskla Poltava that competed in the Soviet Second League were placed in the Persha Liha (Ukrainian Second Division) as such that were relegated.

Clubs' name changes 
 Zorya-MALS Luhansk before the season carried name Zorya Luhansk. Name extension was provided for sponsorship reasons.
 Evis Mykolaiv before the season carried name Sudnobudivnyk Mykolaiv.
 SC Odessa changed its name from SKA Odessa on May 5, 1992, due to restructuring of the Odessa Military District and Armed Forces of Ukraine.

Stadiums

Managerial changes 
Managerial changes approximated

First stage

Qualified teams 
 On April 17, Dynamo Kyiv qualified for European football for the 1992–93 season.
 Before 17th Round, Chornomorets Odessa qualified for the 1992–93 Cup Winners' Cup qualifying round after winning 1992 Ukrainian Cup.
 After 17th Round, Dynamo Kyiv qualified for the Championship play-off.
 After 20th Round, Tavriya Simferopol qualified for European football for the 1992–93 season and the Championship playoff.
 After 20th Round, Shakhtar Donetsk and Dnipro Dnipropetrovsk qualified for the Third place playoff.

Group A final standings 

Notes:

Group B final standings 

Notes:

Second stage

Championship playoff 

Tavriya Simferopol qualified for 1992–93 European Cup Preliminary round and Dynamo Kyiv qualified for 1992–93 UEFA Cup First round.

Third place playoff

Season statistics

Top scorers

Clean sheets

Hat-tricks 

Notes:
 (*) Asterisk identifies players who scored four goals (poker).

Medal squads 
(league appearances and goals listed in brackets)

Note: Players in italic are whose playing position is uncertain.

See also 
Ukrainian First League 1992
1992 Ukrainian Transitional League
Ukrainian Cup 1992

References

External links 
Season information on the Ukrainian Football from Dmytro Troshchiy
Season information on RSSSF
Season information on the Ukrainian Football from Aleksei Kobyzev
Banyas, V. The Top League Cup: long forgotten tournament... (Кубок вищої ліги: таки забутий турнір...) . Ukrainian Premier League. 11 August 2017

1992
1
Ukra
Ukra